Calvin Brackelmann (born 22 August 1999) is a German professional footballer who plays as a centre-back for  club FC Ingolstadt. He is 1.96 meters tall.

Career

Brackelmann started his career with 1. FC Köln II.
In 2021, he signed for VfB Lübeck. In 2022, he signed for FC Ingolstadt.

References

External links
 

1999 births
Living people
German footballers
People from Lüneburg
Association football defenders
Hamburger SV players
FC Hansa Rostock players
1. FC Köln players
1. FC Köln II players
FC Schalke 04 II players
SV Rödinghausen players
VfB Lübeck players
FC Ingolstadt 04 players
Regionalliga players
3. Liga players